Simon Kerr (born 4 January 1970) is a retired Australian rugby union footballer who played for the  and  in Super Rugby, Southland in New Zealand's National Provincial Championship and Irish province Munster in the Celtic League and Heineken Cup.

Having previously represented Australian sides New South Wales Waratahs and Queensland Reds in Super Rugby, and also Gold Coast Breakers and New Zealand side Southland in the National Provincial Championship, Kerr joined Irish province Munster in August 2002, ahead of the 2002–03 season. He went on to earn 22 caps for the province, as well as scoring 1 try, in his two seasons in Ireland.

References

External links
Munster profile
Itsrugby profile

1970 births
Living people
Australian rugby union players
Rugby union props
New South Wales Waratahs players
Queensland Reds players
Munster Rugby players
Rugby union players from New South Wales